Web Developer is an extension for Mozilla-based web browsers that adds editing and debugging tools for web developers. It has been tested to be compatible with Firefox, Flock, and Seamonkey. The extension was developed by Chris Pederick, who has also authored the User Agent Switcher extension.

Web Developer was a grand prize winner in Mozilla's 2006 "Extend Firefox" competition and it is one of the few extensions specifically recommended by Firefox developers for web development.

See also
Firebug (software)
List of Firefox extensions
mOtools

References

External links
Mozilla Add-ons

Free Firefox WebExtensions